The DC Extended Universe (DCEU) is an American media franchise and shared fictional universe that is the setting of superhero films independently produced by Warner Bros., based on characters that appear in DC Comics publications.

As the franchise is composed of films adapted from a variety of DC Comics properties, there are multiple lead actors. Henry Cavill stars as Kal-El / Clark Kent / Superman in the films Man of Steel (2013) and Batman v Superman: Dawn of Justice (2016), while Ben Affleck and Gal Gadot portray Bruce Wayne / Batman and Diana Prince / Wonder Woman, respectively, in the latter film, along with Ezra Miller as Barry Allen / The Flash, Jason Momoa as Arthur Curry / Aquaman, and Ray Fisher as Victor Stone / Cyborg. Affleck and Miller reprise their roles in Suicide Squad (2016), while Gadot reprises her role in Wonder Woman (2017) and Wonder Woman 1984 (2020). All six actors reprise their roles in Justice League (2017), as well as in its 2021 director's cut. Momoa stars in Aquaman (2018) and its sequel Aquaman and the Lost Kingdom (2023), while Miller will star in The Flash (2023), with Affleck reprising his role as Wayne in both The Flash and The Lost Kingdom.

Margot Robbie portrays Harleen Quinzel / Harley Quinn in Suicide Squad and reprises her role in Birds of Prey (2020) and The Suicide Squad (2021). Zachary Levi portrays the eponymous protagonist in Shazam! (2019), with Asher Angel playing the character's alter-ego Billy Batson; both will return in Shazam! Fury of the Gods (2023).

John Cena stars as Christopher Smith / Peacemaker in the television series Peacemaker (2022), after also appearing in The Suicide Squad, while Dwayne Johnson portrays Teth-Adam / Black Adam in Black Adam (2022) and Xolo Maridueña will headline Blue Beetle (2023) as Jaime Reyes / Blue Beetle. Additionally, Viola Davis will star as Amanda Waller in the television series Waller, returning from previous media.

Other prominent cast members who appear in the films and/or series within the franchise include Amy Adams, Kevin Costner, Willem Dafoe, Mary Elizabeth Winstead, Amber Heard, Jeremy Irons, Joel Kinnaman, Diane Lane, Harry Lennix, Jared Leto, Ewan McGregor, Joe Morton, Connie Nielsen, Chris Pine, Michael Shannon, Kristen Wiig, Patrick Wilson, and Robin Wright.

2013–2020

2021–present

Additional media

Television series

See also
Characters of the DC Extended Universe

Notes

References

External links

 Full cast and crew for Man of Steel at IMDb
 Full cast and crew for Batman v Superman: Dawn of Justice at IMDb
 Full cast and crew for Suicide Squad at IMDb
 Full cast and crew for Wonder Woman at IMDb
 Full cast and crew for Justice League at IMDb
 Full cast and crew for Aquaman at IMDb
 Full cast and crew for Shazam! at IMDb
 Full cast and crew for Birds of Prey at IMDb
 Full cast and crew for Wonder Woman 1984 at IMDb

DC Extended Universe
Lists of actors by film series
 Cast